Elísio José Oliveira Esteves (born 5 May 1989) is a Portuguese footballer who plays for Anadia as a forward.

External links
 
 

1989 births
Sportspeople from Matosinhos
Living people
Portuguese footballers
Portugal youth international footballers
Association football midfielders
S.C. Espinho players
AD Fafe players
F.C. Penafiel players
Varzim S.C. players
A.D. Sanjoanense players
Vilaverdense F.C. players
C.D. Trofense players
F.C. Arouca players
SC São João de Ver players
Anadia F.C. players
Liga Portugal 2 players
Campeonato de Portugal (league) players